Çağla Akın (born 19 January 1995 in Istanbul, Turkey) is a Turkish female volleyball player who won the gold medal at the 2013 Club World Championship playing with Nilüfer Belediyespor.

Personal information
Her parents were national handball players.

Career
She played for the VakıfBank Türk Telekom before she transferred in 2012  to Beşiktaş. Akın was a member of the girls' youth national team and the women's junior national team.

Akın  won the gold medal at the 2013 Club World Championship playing with Vakıfbank Istanbul.

Clubs
  VakıfBank Türk Telekom Junior (2009-2011)
  VakıfBank Türk Telekom (2011-2012)
  Beşiktaş Junior (2012-2013)
  Vakıfbank Istanbul (2013-2014)
  Beşiktaş (2014-2017)
  Fenerbahçe (2017-2018)
  Galatasaray (2018-2021)

Awards

National team
 2011 FIVB Girls Youth World Championship - 
 2011 European Youth Summer Olympic Festival - 
 2012 Women's Junior European Volleyball Championship - 
 2014 Women's European Volleyball League - 
 2015 FIVB Volleyball Women's U23 World Championship -

Clubs
 2013 Club World Championship -  Champion, with Vakıfbank Istanbul

See also
 Turkish women in sports

References

1995 births
Volleyball players from Istanbul
Living people
Turkish women's volleyball players
VakıfBank S.K. volleyballers
Beşiktaş volleyballers
European Games gold medalists for Turkey
European Games medalists in volleyball
Volleyball players at the 2015 European Games
Galatasaray S.K. (women's volleyball) players
21st-century Turkish sportswomen